Boutaoshi! ( / Pole Toppling!) is a 2003 Japanese film. It was directed by Tetsu Maeda (School Days with a Pig). and released on March 21, 2003. The film's screenplay was written by Minoru Matsumoto (Dolphin blue: Fuji, mou ichido sora e). It features artists from the Pony Canyon record label, including members of Lead and Flame. Production committee members included those from Pony Canyon, Japan Skyway, Jesus Vision, Tokyo Theaters Company, Inc. and PAL Planning, with distribution by Tokyo Theater and PAL Planning. 

The film is based on the Japanese game bo-taoshi, a capture the flag-like game played during school sports days.

The song's main theme was "Fly Away" by Lead, of which Shinya Tanuichi - who played the lead character - is a member.

Plot
The film is based on the Japanese game bo-taoshi, a capture the flag-like game played during sports days in Japan. The game has since been banned as too dangerous.

Boutaoshi! centers around the sport during its peak, due to the high injury rate among players. A group of students decide to create a team for their school's final tournament. 

The main character is Tsuguo Takayama (Shinya Tanuichi), who has family issues, most notably with his father, who constantly belittles him after his mother's suicide  (Miyuki Matsuda). He starts playing bo-taoshi, though initially he has little interest; after his father mocks bo-taoshi, Tsuguo becomes passionate about it.

He discovers he has a talent for the sport and begins playing with his classmates and friends. The mischievous Isamu Hisanaga (Kyohei Kaneko) sees him and comes up with a plan to test Tsuguo's skills. Tsuguo is conned into joining the final competition.

Cast
Shinya Tanuichi as Tsuguo Takayama
Kyohei Kaneko as Isamu Hisanaga
Akira Kagimoto as Atsushi Tabuchi
Keita Furuya as Suzumi Manabu
Hiroki Nakadoi as Toru Akasaka (Nakkan)
Airi Taira as Sayuri Konno
Miyuki Matsuda as Yuko Takayama
Yukari Taki as Miki Takayama
Tomokazu Miura as Kotaro Ishigaki
Nanako Takushi as Nurse
Yu Kitamura as MC
Katsuya Kobayashi as Classmate

Release
Boutaoshi! made its theatrical debut in Japan on March 21, 2003. It was released on DVD on August 20 of the same year.

References

External links
Boutaoshi! - AllCinema

2003 films
2000s Japanese films
Films set in Miyazaki Prefecture